"All Falls Down" is a song by British-Norwegian record producer and DJ Alan Walker featuring American singer Noah Cyrus and fellow British DJ and record producer Digital Farm Animals, with uncredited vocals by Swedish singer Juliander. It was composed by Digital Farm Animals, Pablo Bowman, Sarah Blanchard and its producers Walker, Mood Melodies, Digital Farm Animals and The Six, with lyrics written by The Six, Bowman, Blanchard and Daniel Boyle. The song was released on 27 October 2017 via Mer Musikk and Ultra Music to mixed reviews from critics, who praised Cyrus's vocals but deemed the song inferior to Walker's previous songs.

Background
On 23 October 2017, Walker released a trailer for the single. Described as "an action-packed adventure of epic proportion" and "a real roller coaster affair" by critics, it features a variety of subplots, including romance, kidnapping, cult-like burials, "an Alan Walker-branded time capsule and explosions", as well as "flaming torches, desert landscapes, welded metal and a digital timer". On 25 October 2017, Walker revealed features on the song via social media.

Walker offered in a press release: "With this record I got the opportunity to collaborate with some amazing artists. Noah Cyrus' voice is absolutely incredible! Ever since I first heard the topline, I've been in love with it and can't wait for my fans to hear it as well. It has a refreshing production that still fits well within my signature sound, which is important for me to maintain as I evolve as an artist." Cyrus added: "I've loved this record since the moment I heard it. It's amazing to be a part of this song with such a badass dude and it's really incredible to be a part of this project."

Critical reception
Kat Bein of Billboard wrote: "The track kicks off with glimmering acoustic strums and finger-snaps, all leading up to a bouncy, anthemic drop." Matthew Meadow of Your EDM felt "the drop is still characteristically Walker", and appreciates that "the influence from [Digital Farm Animals] is noticeable". Kevin Apaza of Direct Lyrics praised Walker for "gives listeners a counterbalance in the form of an uplifting electro pop beat and drops" despite the "rather sad" lyrics. Erik of EDM Sauce wrote a mixed review of the song, saying that the song has "a more laid back almost tropical feeling", which he opined as "something like Kygo might release". He also praised Cyrus for "providing gorgeous vocals throughout". He concluded by deeming the song "a lesser known, forgettable release" from Walker.

Music video
The music video, released alongside the single, joins a post-apocalyptic trilogy which began with the visual for Walker's previous single "Tired". It continues where the previous video left off, taking place eighty-three years after a solar storm destroyed all technology on earth in 2017.

Track listing

Credits and personnel
Credits adapted from Tidal.

 Alan Walker – composition, production, engineering, programming
 Noah Cyrus – vocals
 Digital Farm Animals – composition, production, programming
 Sarah Blanchard – composition, lyrics
 The Six – composition, lyrics, production
 Pablo Bowman – composition, lyrics, guitar
 Mood Melodies – composition, production, engineering, vocals, guitar, programming, recording engineering, vocal production
 Daniel Boyle – lyrics, vocal production
 Sören von Malmborg – mixing engineering, mastering engineering
 Chris O'Ryan – engineering, vocals, vocal production, co-production
 Carl Hovind – engineering, programming
 Juliander – vocals
 Ashleigh Scotcher – background vocals
 Gunnar Greve – executive production
 Kristian Kvalvaag – guitar
 Tommy Kristiansen – guitar
 Keith Parry – recording engineering
 Jenna Andrews – vocal production
 Alex Holmberg – vocal production

Charts

Weekly charts

Year-end charts

Certifications

Release history

References

2017 singles
2017 songs
Alan Walker (music producer) songs
Noah Cyrus songs
Digital Farm Animals songs
Songs written by Alan Walker (music producer)
Songs written by Digital Farm Animals
Songs written by Mood Melodies
Songs written by Richard Boardman
Songs written by Pablo Bowman
Songs written by Sarah Blanchard
Song recordings produced by Digital Farm Animals
Number-one singles in Norway
Electropop ballads